Sport Relief 2012 was a fundraising event organised by Comic Relief. It was broadcast on BBC One and BBC Two on the evening of 23 March 2012 from 7:00 pm to 1:45 am, live from the BBC Television Centre. It raised £50,447,197, the most ever raised by a Comic Relief event.

Before/after the live event
In the autumn of 2011, David Walliams swam  of the River Thames in eight days. During the eight days Walliams suffered from illness and flu. Walliams took time to recover after the event due to the intake of Thames water that contained bacteria and sewage. He swam a total distance in eight days, a total of 111,352 strokes were swam and 68,186 calories were burnt. So far he has raised  £1,194,258 for Sport Relief.

Fearless Blue Peter presenter Helen Skelton made it to the South Pole in just 18 days by ski, bike and kite, bringing her epic,  Antarctic expedition to a triumphant close. For this gruelling challenge, she travelled up to 14 hours a day across the coldest and windiest place on earth, battling blizzards and sub-zero temperatures. It was shown for 9 weeks on Mondays on BBC1 at 4:30pm and an adult version was shown on the Fridays on BBC1 at 8:30pm before the main event.

On 27 February 2012, comedian John Bishop took on a week of challenges billed as "John Bishop's Week of Hell". Originally John was to complete the challenge with James Corden but he had to pull out due to his commitments with the West End Show One Man, Two Guvnors. John rowed, ran and cycled 295 miles from Paris to London in just five days. John raised £3,412,261. His programme was shown the day before Sport Relief night at 9:00pm on BBC1.

"The One Show 1000" ran from 16 to 25 March, 1,000 One Show viewers ran a mammoth 1,000-mile, ten-day relay through cities across Scotland, Northern Ireland, Wales and England. Starting on the Isle of Mull, our brave team ran night and day to finish triumphantly on The Mall in London.
 
"The Frank Skinner Dipping Challenge" was on Sport Relief day, brave Frank is threw himself in at the deep end for Sport Relief and facing one of his biggest phobias – swimming. He did a length, 25 metres, in front of 3,000,000 people on the Sport Relief show.
 
On Saturday 10 March, celebrity teams from England, Ireland, Scotland and Wales set off head-to-head in the "DHL First Nation Home" challenge. Over seven days, the teams covered a gruelling distance of more than 1,000 miles around the four nations. On Sunday 25 March, the public joined them and team England won, the celebrities were Jason Isaacs, Timothy Peake, Caroline Quentin, Evanna Lynch, Brendan O'Carroll and Alan Sugar along with 5 other celebrities. The challenge was judged by Richard Hammond and Anita Rani, and was narrated by Alexander Armstrong.

Presenters

Donation process

The total raised on the night of broadcast was over £50,000,000. The four main celebrity Sport Relief challenges raised over £6,000,000.

Large donations
Walliams vs TheThames – £2,501,240
Bishop's Week of Hell – £3,412,261
Flintoff's Record Breakers – £260,394
Helen Skelton's Polar Challenge – £150,000+
Sainsbury's – £4,031,108.28 (so far)
British Airways – £1,800,787

Sketches

Musical performances

Comic Relief
2012
2012 in British television
2012 in British sport
March 2012 events in the United Kingdom